Qianzhou or Qian Prefecture was a zhou (prefecture) of the Khitan-ruled Liao dynasty (907–1125) centering on modern Beipiao, Liaoning, China.

References
 

Prefectures of the Liao dynasty
Former prefectures in Liaoning